"I Want You to Stay" was the fifth single released from Maxïmo Park, taken from their debut album A Certain Trigger. It was the last single from the album, released on 20 February 2006. "I Want You to Stay" reached number 21 on the UK Singles Chart. The music video for the song was also the first video not to feature the band.

A B-side from Maxïmo Park's February 2005 single for "Apply Some Pressure" features a song called "I Want You to Leave," a play on the title of "I Want You to Stay." The song is also included on the band's 2006 compilation album Missing Songs.

Track listing
CD (WAP201CD)
 "I Want You to Stay" (Edit) – 3:12
 "La Quinta" – 2:38
 "I Want You to Stay" (Field Music / J. Xaverre Remix) – 4:06

7" #1 (7WAP201, turquoise vinyl)
 "I Want You to Stay" (Original Demo) – 5:16
 "I Want You to Stay" (Field Music / J. Xaverre Remix) – 4:06

7" #2 (7WAP201R, white vinyl)
 "I Want You to Stay" (Cristian Vogel Remix) – 4:29
 "La Quinta" – 2:38

External links
Single information on MaxïmoPark.com

2006 singles
Maxïmo Park songs
Songs written by Paul Smith (rock vocalist)
Song recordings produced by Paul Epworth
2005 songs
Songs written by Lukas Wooller